The men's individual was an archery event held as part of the Archery at the 2000 Summer Olympics programme. Like other archery events at the Olympics, it featured the recurve discipline. All archery was done at a range of 70 metres. 64 archers competed.

The competition format was unchanged from 1996. The competition began with a 72-arrow ranking round.  This was followed by three elimination rounds, in which archers competed head-to-head in 18-arrow matches. After these rounds, there were 8 archers left. The quarterfinals, semifinals, and medal matches (collectively termed the "finals round") were 12-arrow matches.  In all matches, losers were eliminated and received a final rank determined by their score in that round, with the exception of the semifinals. The losers of the semifinals competed in the bronze medal match.

Schedule

Records
Prior to this competition, the existing world and Olympic records were as follows.

72 arrow ranking round

12 arrow match

Results

The initial round was held on 16 September. Each archer fired 72 arrows, with the score from this round determining their seeding into the single-elimination tournament to follow.

Ranking Round

Competition bracket

Section 1

Section 2

Section 3

Section 4

Finals

References

Sources
 Official Report
 

Archery at the 2000 Summer Olympics
Men's events at the 2000 Summer Olympics